Sushi is a Japanese food composed of specially prepared vinegared rice combined with varied ingredients such as (chiefly) seafood (often uncooked), vegetables, egg, and occasionally tropical fruits. Styles of sushi and its presentation vary widely, but the key ingredient is sushi rice, also referred to as shari or sumeshi. Numerous traditions surround not only the preparation of sushi, but also its service and consumption. Internationally, sushi has become iconic of Japanese cuisine and is popular in many countries.

Sushi restaurants

 Araki – a sushi restaurant that received a three-star rating in the 2011 edition of the Michelin Guide for Tokyo, Yokohama and Kamakura.
 The Araki – opened 2014, in London, by Japanese chef Mitsuhiro Araki. It was awarded two stars in the 2016 Michelin Guide for the UK and Ireland, then being awarded three in the 2018 Guide, before making it the first Japanese restaurant ever to lose all three of its stars (in the UK) by 2020.
 Benihana – an American restaurant company based in Aventura, Florida that owns or franchises 116 Japanese cuisine restaurants around the world, including its flagship Benihana Teppanyaki brand, as well as the Haru (fusion cuisine) and RA Sushi restaurants. It was founded by Hiroaki Aoki in New York City.
 Esaki – a Michelin 3-star sushi restaurant located in the Hills Aoyama building in Shibuya. It is owned and operated by sushi chef Shintaro Esaki.
 Feng Sushi – a UK-based sushi restaurant chain known for advocating sustainable fish farming
 Genji – a subsidiary of Peace Dining Corporation, it is a major sushi provider to Whole Foods Market and the largest vendor of sushi in the United States. It serves the eastern U.S., California and the United Kingdom. Headquartered in Philadelphia, Pennsylvania, the company currently operates over 165 sushi and Japanese cuisine restaurants in 18 U.S. states and D.C., and in London and Scotland.
 Genki Sushi – a chain of conveyor belt sushi restaurants established in 1990 in Japan.
 Hanko Sushi - the largest sushi restaurant chain in Finland
 Hayato, Los Angeles
 Ii-ma Sushi – a Japanese sushi restaurant operating in South London, UK
 Itsu – a British chain of Asian-inspired fast food shops and restaurants, and a grocery company.
 Kokoro – a Korean-Japanese sushi restaurant chain operating throughout the UK
 Kura – a conveyor belt sushi restaurant chain with 362 locations in Japan, and a few more outside Japan.
 Masa – a Michelin three-star Japanese and sushi restaurant located on the fourth floor of the Time Warner Center at 10 Columbus Circle (at West 60th Street and Broadway) in Manhattan in New York City. Masa garnered the Michelin Guide's highest rating starting with the 2009 guide and was the first Japanese restaurant in the U.S. to do so.
 Miya's – located in New Haven, Connecticut, USA, it is the first sustainable sushi restaurant in the world.

 Momiji, Seattle
 Morihiro
 Nimblefish, Portland, Oregon
 Q Sushi
 Saburo's, Portland, Oregon
 Sakae Sushi – a restaurant chain based in Singapore serving Japanese cuisine, and is the flagship brand of Apex-Pal International Ltd. Aimed at the low to mid-level pricing market, it purveys sushi, sashimi, teppanyaki, yakimono, nabemono, tempura, agemono, ramen, udon, soba and donburi served either à la carte or via a sushi conveyor belt.
 Sasabune – a Japanese sushi restaurant located on the Upper East Side of Manhattan, New York City.
 Standing Sushi Bar – a Japanese-food restaurant chain in Singapore and Indonesia

 Sticks'n'Sushi – a Copenhagen-based restaurant and take-away chain specialising in sushi and yakitori sticks, it consists of 12 restaurants in the Greater Copenhagen area and 7 restaurants in the UK.
 Sukiyabashi Jiro – A Michelin 3-star sushi restaurant in Ginza, Chūō, Tokyo, Japan that is owned and operated by sushi master Jiro Ono.
 Sushi Kaneyoshi
 Sushi Mizutani – a former sushi restaurant in Ginza, Chūō, Tokyo, Japan that was awarded two Michelin stars.
 Sushi Nakazawa – an upscale Japanese sushi restaurant located on Commerce Street in Manhattan, New York City. Daisuke Nakazawa is its head chef.
 Sushi of Gari – a Japanese sushi restaurant located on the Upper East Side of Manhattan, in 2006 and 2009, Michelin Guide gave it a one-star rating.
 Sushi Roku – an upscale American sushi restaurant chain
 Sushi Saito – a three Michelin Star Japanese cuisine restaurant in Minato, Tokyo, primarily known for serving sushi.
 Sushi Seki – a Japanese sushi restaurant located on the Upper East Side in Manhattan, New York City
 Sushi Yasuda – a Michelin one-star Japanese sushi restaurant located in the Grand Central area of Midtown Manhattan, in New York City
 Sushi Yoshitake – a Michelin 3-Star sushi restaurant in Ginza, Chūō, Tokyo, Japan
 Uchi – a contemporary Japanese sushi restaurant located in Austin, Texas
 Urasawa – a Japanese restaurant located in Beverly Hills, Los Angeles County, California that as of 2014 is considered the second most expensive in the world after Sublimotion, at $1,111 per person.
 Wasabi – a fast food restaurant chain based in the United Kingdom focused on Japanese food, especially sushi and bento, it operates in London and New York
 YO! Sushi – a company that owns, operates, and franchises conveyor belt sushi restaurants, principally in the United Kingdom, Ireland, United States, Europe and the Middle East.
 Zuma

See also
 List of fish and chip restaurants
 List of Japanese restaurants
 List of oyster bars
 List of seafood restaurants

References

External links
 

Lists of restaurants